The Plague Column or Immaculata is a Baroque plague column (Marian and Holy Trinity column) in Košice, Slovakia. 

The column is situated in a small park and commemorates the gratitude to Mary for an end to the plague epidemic from 1709 and 1710. It was erected at the place of medieval gallows at Fő utca (Main Street, now called Hlavná ulica) in 1723. Local legend holds that the relics of Saint Valentine are hidden beneath the structure.

It is a  column on a stone basement with sculptures of Saint Joseph, Saint Sebastian and Saint Ladislaus. There is a sculpture of the Virgin Mary on the top of the column. The sculptures of Saint Gabriel, Saint Elizabeth of Hungary, Saint Margaret, Saint Michael the Archangel and Saint Barbara are on the pillars of the fence.

The statue was damaged during World War II. It was restored by academic sculptor Vojtech Löffler in the years 1949-1951 and 1971–1972. The last restoration took place in 1996–1998.

See also 
 Plague Column, Vienna

External links

Buildings and structures completed in 1723
Marian and Holy Trinity columns
Buildings and structures in Košice
Monumental columns
Second plague pandemic
1723 sculptures
Statues of the Virgin Mary
Tourist attractions in Košice